Klaus Martin Schwab (born 30 March 1938) is a German engineer, economist and founder of the World Economic Forum (WEF). He has acted as the WEF's chairman since founding the organisation in 1971.

Life
Schwab was born to Eugen Wilhelm Schwab and Erika Epprecht in Ravensburg. His parents had moved from Switzerland to Germany during the Third Reich in order for his father to assume the role of director at Escher Wyss AG, an industrial company and contractor for then Nazi Germany. Schwab's family was monitored by the Gestapo, which in 1944 also interrogated his mother (who was from Zürich) for speaking with a Swiss accent in public. Schwab was raised Catholic. He is a citizen of Germany although he has three Swiss grandparents and two Swiss brothers.

Schwab has been married since 1971 to Hilde Schwab, a former assistant of his. The wedding took place in Sertig Valley at a Reformed church. The couple live in Cologny in Switzerland. The Schwabs have two adult children, Nicole (born 1975/76) and Olivier. Nicole Schwab co-founded the Gender Equality Project.

Education
Schwab attended 1st and 2nd grade at the primary school in the Wädenswil district of Au ZH, in Switzerland. After World War II, the family moved back to Germany where Schwab attended the Spohn-Gymnasium in Ravensburg until his Abitur in 1957.

In 1961, he graduated as a mechanical engineer from Swiss Federal Institute of Technology in Zurich, which awarded him a doctorate in engineering entitled: Der längerfristige Exportkredit als betriebswirtschaftliches Problem des Maschinenbaues (Longer-term export credit as a business problem in mechanical engineering). He was also awarded a doctorate in economics from the University of Fribourg, and a Master of Public Administration degree from the John F. Kennedy School of Government at Harvard University.

Career
Schwab was professor of business policy at the University of Geneva from 1972 to 2003, and since then has been an Honorary Professor there. Since 1979, he has published the Global Competitiveness Report, an annual report assessing the potential for increasing productivity and economic growth of countries around the world, written by a team of economists.

As author
Schwab has authored or co-authored several books. Some consider him to be "an evangelist" for "stakeholder capitalism". The Fourth Industrial Revolution, the subject of a 2016 book he wrote, is another of ideas he has popularised. In January 2017 Steven Poole in The Guardian criticised Schwab's Fourth Industrial Revolution book, pointing out that "the internet of things" would probably be hackable. He also criticised Schwab for showing that future technologies may be used for good or evil, but not taking a position on the issues, instead offering only vague policy recommendations. The Financial Times "innovation editor" found "the clunking lifelessness of the prose" led him to "suspect this book really was written by humans—ones who inhabit a strange twilight world of stakeholders, externalities, inflection points and “developtory sandboxes”." 

The political scientist Klaus-Gerd Giesen has argued that the dominant ideology of the Fourth Industrial Revolution is transhumanism.

World Economic Forum

In 1971, Schwab founded the European Management Forum, which was renamed the WEF in 1987. In 1971, he also published Moderne Unternehmensführung im Maschinenbau (Modern Enterprise Management in Mechanical Engineering). In that book, he argued that the management of a modern enterprise must serve both shareholders and corporate stakeholders (die Interessenten), to achieve long-term growth and prosperity. Schwab has championed the multistakeholder concept since the WEF's inception.

In 2003 Schwab appointed José María Figueres as CEO of the WEF, his intended successor. In October 2004, Figueres resigned over his undeclared receipt of more than US$900,000 in consultancy fees from the French telecommunications firm Alcatel while he was working at the Forum. In 2006, Transparency International highlighted this incident in their Global Corruption Report.

In 2015, the WEF was formally recognised by the Swiss Government as an "international body".

Criticism

Salary level and lack of financial transparency 
While Schwab declared that excessively high management salaries were "no longer socially acceptable", his own annual salary of about one million Swiss francs (a little more than $1 million USD) has been repeatedly questioned by the media. The Swiss radio and television corporation SRF mentioned this salary level in the context of ongoing public contributions to the WEF and the fact that the Forum does not pay any federal taxes. Moreover, the former Frankfurter Allgemeine Zeitung journalist Jürgen Dunsch made the criticism that the WEF's financial reports were not very transparent since neither income nor expenditure were broken down. Schwab has also drawn ire for mixing the finances of the not-for-profit WEF and other for-profit business ventures. For example, the WEF awarded a multimillion dollar contract to USWeb in 1998. Yet shortly after the deal went through, Mr. Schwab took a board seat at the same company, reaping valuable stock options.

Capture of democratic structures and institutions 
According to the Transnational Institute (TNI), the Forum is planning to replace a recognised democratic model with a model where a self-selected group of "stakeholders" make decisions on behalf of the people. The think tank summarises that we are increasingly entering a world where gatherings such as Davos are "a silent global coup d'état" to capture governance.

In a 2017 interview, Schwab said that Russian President Vladimir Putin had been recognized as a Young Global Leader, and also mentioned Canadian Prime Minister Justin Trudeau: "I have to say, when I mention now names, like Mrs. (Angela) Merkel and even Vladimir Putin, and so on, they all have been Young Global Leaders of the World Economic Forum. But what we are very proud of now is the young generation like Prime Minister [Justin] Trudeau... We penetrate the cabinet. So yesterday I was at a reception for Prime Minister Trudeau and I know that half of his cabinet, or even more than half of his cabinet, are actually Young Global Leaders."

Controversy with Davos municipality 
In June 2021, Schwab sharply criticised the "profiteering", "complacency" and "lack of commitment" by the municipality of Davos in relation to the WEF annual meeting. He mentioned that the preparation of the COVID-related meeting in Singapore in 2021/2022 had created an alternative to its Swiss host and sees the chance that the annual meeting will stay in Davos at between 40 and 70 per cent.

Awards and honours
Among other awards, Schwab has been conferred with the French Legion of Honour (knight distinction), the Grand Cross with Star of the National Order of Germany, and the Japanese Grand Cordon of the Order of the Rising Sun. He also was awarded the Dan David Prize, and was knighted by Queen Elizabeth as Knight Commander of the Order of St Michael and St George.

Publications

Articles 
 "Global Corporate Citizenship: Working with Governments and Civil Society." Foreign Affairs, vol. 87, no. 1 (Jan.-Feb. 2008), pp. 107–18. .

Books 
The Global Information Technology Report 2001 – 2002: Readiness for the Networked World. with Geoffrey S. Kirkman, Peter K. Cornelius and  Jeffrey D. Sachs, New York,  Oxford University Press (2002). , .

 The Fourth Industrial Revolution. Geneva: World Economic Forum (2016). .
 Shaping the Future of the Fourth Industrial Revolution, with Nicholas Davis. New York: Crown Publishing Group (2018).
 COVID-19: The Great Reset, with Thierry Malleret. Forum Publishing (2020). . 
 Stakeholder Capitalism: A Global Economy that Works for Progress, People and Planet. Hoboken, NJ: Wiley (2021). .
 The Great Narrative: For a Better Future, with Thierry Malleret. Forum Publishing (2022). .

References

External links

Klaus Schwab at IMDb

1938 births
Living people
ETH Zurich alumni
German businesspeople
German economists
German male writers
German philanthropists
Grand Cordons of the Order of the Rising Sun
Harvard Kennedy School alumni
Honorary Knights Commander of the Order of St Michael and St George
Honorary Knights Commander of the Order of the British Empire
Knights Commander of the Order of Merit of the Federal Republic of Germany
Member of the Academy of the Kingdom of Morocco
Members of the Steering Committee of the Bilderberg Group
People from Ravensburg
People from the Free People's State of Württemberg
University of Fribourg alumni
Academic staff of the University of Fribourg
World Economic Forum